The Indian state of Rajasthan is famous for historic havelis, forts and palaces. Some of these are:

Jaipur district
Amber Palace (Amber Fort) 
Shahpura Haveli, Shahpura
 
Samode Palace, Jaipur 
City Palace, Jaipur 
Rambagh Palace, Jaipur 
Jal Mahal, Jaipur 
Hawa Mahal (Palace of Winds), Jaipur

Udaipur district
City Palace, Udaipur, 
Jag Niwas (Lake Palace), Udaipur
Jag Mandir, Udaipur
Shiv Niwas Palace, Udaipur

Bikaner district
Junagarh Fort and Palace, Bikaner
Laxmi Niwas Palace, Bikaner

Jodhpur district

 Umaid Bhawan Palace, Jodhpur
 Mehrangarh Fort, Jodhpur
 Bal Samand Lake Palace, Jodhpur

Other districts
Devigarh, Delwara
Khimsar Fort, Khimsar 
Jaisalmer Fort, Jaisalmer
Lalgarh Palace, Bikaner
Laxmangarh Fort, Sikar 
Mundota Fort and Palace
Neemrana Fort and Palace

Sariska Palace, Sariska, Alwar
Lohagarh Fort, Bharatpur
Bijai Garh, Bayana
Timangarh, Karauli District
Hindaun Fort
Matiya Mahal, Hindaun
Mandrail fort, Karauli
Mandholi fort, Sikar
Patan fort, Kotputli

Further reading

Palaces
Rajasthan
palaces in Rajasthan